Arakawa's syndrome II is an autosomal dominant metabolic disorder that causes a deficiency of the enzyme tetrahydrofolate-methyltransferase; affected individuals cannot properly metabolize methylcobalamin, a type of Vitamin B12.

Presentation
This disorder causes neurological problems, including intellectual disability, brain atrophy and ventricular dilation, myoclonus, hypotonia, and epilepsy.  

It is also associated with growth retardation, megaloblastic anemia, pectus excavatum, scoliosis, vomiting, diarrhea, and hepatosplenomegaly.

Genetics

Arakawa's syndrome II is inherited in an autosomal dominant manner. This means the defective gene responsible for disorder is located on an autosome, and one copy of the defective gene is sufficient to cause the disorder when inherited from a parent who has the disorder.

Diagnosis

Management

Eponym
It is called "Arakawa syndrome 2" after Tsuneo Arakawa (1949–2003), a Japanese Physician.; in this context, "Arakawa syndrome 1" refers to Glutamate formiminotransferase deficiency.

References

External links 

 

Syndromes affecting blood
Vitamin, coenzyme, and cofactor metabolism disorders
Autosomal dominant disorders
Syndromes affecting the nervous system
Syndromes with intellectual disability
Diseases named for discoverer